General Glass Industries was a United States-based wholly owned subsidiary of General Glass International.  Also known as "GGI", this company manufactured sheet glass from 1988 until 1993 using the Fourcault process.  GGI also produced cut sheet and window glass from flat glass produced by other manufacturers. The site of GGI was located in Jeannette, Pennsylvania, which is located east of Pittsburgh, PA.  GGI was one of the largest single employers in Jeannette and was one of the last of the "major" glass plants to operate in the "Glass City".  According to local rumors the "Window House" as it was known, was once the largest producer of window glass in the world.

History 
Production ceased in July 1993 at the end of the campaign, or expected life of a glass furnace before it requires a rebuild or overhaul.  After that time the parent company, General Glass International, weighed its options before electing to liquidate operations to pursue initiatives in other locations. The site was purchased by the Westmoreland Industrial Development Corporation. The site of GGI is now part of the family of Westmoreland County Industrial Parks, the Jeannette Industrial Park.  After some demolition and remediation operations, the site now hosts a variety of businesses.

The parent company of GGI, General Glass International, continues to market flat glass products to this day.

See also 
Parent company
Manufacturer

External links
General Glass International
Jeannette Industrial Park

Glassmaking companies of the United States
Defunct glassmaking companies
Manufacturing companies based in Pennsylvania
Manufacturing companies established in 1988
Manufacturing companies disestablished in 1993
1988 establishments in Pennsylvania
1993 disestablishments in Pennsylvania
Defunct manufacturing companies based in Pennsylvania